Viggo Sommer Kristensen (born 28 January 1957) is a Danish musician and comedian. He is primarily known for his work with the comedy trio De Nattergale, which made the popular TV-show The Julekalender in 1991. Sommer also appeared in Bamse's Billedbog for children. In late November 2015 the Danish punk band Skullclub published a Christmas album "Sving Dine Dadler" in which Sommer contributed the vocals.

Sommer was born in Viby at Aarhus, and still lives in Aarhus.

Discography

Solo albums 
 2002 Så sku' den ged vist være barberet

With De Nattergale 
 1987 Hva' har vi da gjort ... siden vi ska' ha'et så godt
 1988 Nu ka' det vist ik' bli' meget bedre
 1990 Det ka' jo aldrig gå værre end hiel gal
 1991 Songs From The Julekalender
 1992 Vi må da håbe det bli'r bedre i morgen
 1995 Nu griber det godt nok om sig

Filmography 
1989 Walter og Carlo i Amerika
1991 The Julekalender
1994 Vildbassen
2001 CWC/Canal Wild Card
2003 CWC World
2011 Ludvig & Julemanden
2013 Pendlerkids
2015 Hedensted High

Commercials 
2002–03 Vildmændene – commercial for Arla

References

External links 
 
 
 

1957 births
Danish male comedians
Danish male actors
People from Aarhus
Living people